James Street railway station is a railway station in Secunderabad. The station was built in 1874 and was the second station after Secunderabad station on the Hyderabad–Wadi sector by Nizam State Railways. The station derives it name from erstwhile James Street located adjacent to this station. This street after independence was later renamed as Mahatma Gandhi Road.  Other localities such as Rani Gunj and the Hussain Sagar lake are accessible from this station.

Lines
Hyderabad Multi-Modal Transport System
–Hyderabad (FH line)

References

External links
MMTS Timings as per South Central Railway
MMTS Train Timings

MMTS stations in Hyderabad
Transport in Secunderabad
Buildings and structures in Secunderabad
1874 establishments in India